Love and Marriage is a British comedy-drama series that was broadcast on ITV beginning on 5 June 2013. It stars Alison Steadman as Pauline Paradise, a recently retired lollipop lady, who after the death of her father Frank (David Ryall) decides to leave her family and goes to live with her sister. It was written by Stewart Harcourt.
The series consisted of 6 episodes. In August 2013, ITV cancelled the series.

Cast

 Alison Steadman as Pauline Paradise
 Duncan Preston as Ken Paradise, Pauline's husband
 Celia Imrie as Rowan Holdaway, Pauline's sister
 Larry Lamb as Tommy Sutherland, Rowan's boyfriend
 Stewart Wright as Kevin Paradise, Pauline and Ken's eldest son, Heather and Martin's brother and Sarah's husband
 Ashley Jensen as Sarah Paradise, Kevin's wife
 Niky Wardley as Heather McCallister, Pauline and Ken's daughter, Kevin and Martin's sister and Charlie's wife
 James McArdle as Charlie McCallister, Heather's husband
 Graeme Hawley as Martin Paradise, Pauline and Ken's youngest son, Heather and Kevin's brother and Michelle's husband
 Zoe Telford as Michelle Paradise, Martin's Wife
 Jessica Sula as Scarlet Quilter, Rowan's Granddaughter
 David Ryall as Frank Holdaway, Pauline and Rowan's father who dies after falling off a hammock Pauline got as a Leaving Present
 George Boden as Nathan Paradise, Kevin and Sarah's Son

References

External links

2010s British drama television series
2013 British television series debuts
2013 British television series endings
British comedy-drama television shows
ITV television dramas
Television series by Endemol
2010s British television miniseries
English-language television shows